Kapela  may refer to:

People 
 Jan Kapela (1931–1987), Polish politician
 Jaś Kapela (born 1984), Polish poet

Places
 Kapela, Bjelovar-Bilogora County, a village in north-central Croatia
 Kapela Kalnička, a village in northern Croatia
 Kapela, a mountain range in south-central Croatia
 Mala Kapela, a mountain in south-central Croatia
 Velika Kapela, a mountain in south-central Croatia
 Kostanjevica Monastery, referred to as Kapela by the locals

See also 
 Kapella (disambiguation)
 Kappela
 Kapelle (disambiguation)
 Capela (disambiguation)
 Capella (disambiguation)